Gerasimov or Gerasimova (feminine; Гера́симова) is a Russian surname, derived from the given name Gerasim. Notable people with the surname include:

Aleksei Gerasimov (disambiguation), multiple people
Aleksandr Gerasimov (painter) (1881–1963), Russian/Soviet painter
Aleksandr Gerasimov (footballer) (born 1969), former Russian professional football player
Anatoly Gerasimov (1945–2013), Russian/American musician
Dmitry Gerasimov (c.1465–after 1535), Russian translator, diplomat, and philologist
Egor Gerasimov (born 1992), Belarusian tennis player
Gennadi Gerasimov (1930–2010), Soviet diplomat
Innokentiy Gerasimov (scientist) (1905–1985), a Soviet geographer, geomorphologist, soil scientist, and academician
Innokenty Gerasimov (1918–1992), a Soviet army officer and Hero of the Soviet Union 
Ivan Gerasimov (footballer) (born 1985), Russian footballer
Ivan Gerasimov (botanist) (1867–about 1920), Russian botanist
Ivan Gerasymov (1921–2008), Soviet military general and Ukrainian politician
Kirill Gerasimov (born 1971), Russian professional poker player
Konstantin G. Gerasimov, a Russian soloist with the Alexandrov Ensemble
Mikhail Mikhaylovich Gerasimov (1907–1970), a Soviet archaeologist and anthropologist
Mikhail Gerasimov (poet) (1889–1939), Russian/Soviet poet
Mikhail Gerasimov (viticulturist) (1884–1966), a Soviet viticulturist
Nikolay Gerasimov (1911–1960), a Soviet aircraft pilot and Hero of the Soviet Union
Pavel Gerasimov (athlete) (born 1979), Russian athlete
Pavel Gerasimov (diplomat), a Soviet diplomat and Ambassador
Pyotr Gerasimov (1877–1919), a Russian politician
Sergey Gerasimov (disambiguation), multiple people
Vadim Gerasimov, co-developer of the famous video game Tetris
Valentin Gerasimov (born 1940), Russian politician
Valery Gerasimov (born 1955), Chief of the General Staff of Russia
Vitaly Gerasimov (born 1977), Russian general
Vladimir Gerasimov (footballer, born 1975), Russian professional football coach and former player
Vladimir Gerasimov (footballer, born 1989), Russian professional footballer
Yakov Gerasimov (1903-?), a Soviet physical chemist

See also 
Gerasimov Institute of Cinematography
Gerasimov Merchant Shop

Russian-language surnames
Bulgarian-language surnames
Patronymic surnames
Surnames from given names